Bruce Nissen (born January 20, 1948) is a professor emeritus of labor studies and director of research at the Center for Labor Research and Studies (CLRS) at Florida International University (FIU).  He also formerly directed that university's Research Institute on Social and Economic Policy (RISEP).

Childhood and education
Nissen was born in Ames, Iowa, 1948 to Raymond and Irene Nissen.

He obtained a bachelor's degree in philosophy and psychology from Grinnell College in 1970, a master's degree in labor studies from Rutgers University and a Ph.D. from Columbia University in 1975.

He married Karen Lieberman in 1978. They have two sons.

Career
Nissen was appointed an assistant professor of labor studies at Indiana University-Purdue University at Indianapolis in 1981.  In 1985, Nissen became an associate professor of labor studies at Indiana University Northwest.

Nissen joined the Center for Labor Research and Studies at Florida International University in 1997.  His wife, Karen Lieberman, has retired from a professorship in the Hospitality College at the North Miami campus of Johnson & Wales University.

Research
Nissen's research focuses on a wide variety of topics regarding workers and the U.S. labor movement.

Early in his career he focused on the impact and dissemination of the "new labor history" in labor studies as well as its impact on labor education in higher education and labor unions themselves. His early work also centered on theories of the labor movement, enterprise zones, plant closings, labor-community coalitions confronting plant closings, the nature of a labor-management "accord" in the post-World War II years in the U.S. and similar topics.

His later research looks at living wage campaigns, labor-community coalitions, the future direction of the U.S. labor movement, unions and workplace reorganization, unions operating in a globalized environment, unions facing "union busting," and the like.

In November 2001, he criticized economist Arthur Laffer (recently appointed an advisor to Florida Governor-elect Rick Scott), saying Laffer's economic theory "basically doesn't hold water".

Memberships and awards
In 2011 Nissen won the Lifetime Achievement Award from the United Association for Labor Education (UALE).  This is the highest award given in the field of labor education.  In 2004 he won the Florida International University “Excellence in Research” award.  This is the highest yearly research award given by the university.

Nissen is a member of the United Association for Labor Education, and has served on the executive board of the organization.  He is past secretary-treasurer of the Labor and Labor Movements section of the American Sociological Association (ASA). He has also served on numerous boards and commissions in his local community (such as the Community Coalition for a Living Wage and the South Florida chapter of Jobs with Justice) and has served as an adviser and researcher for city, county and state government entities as well as labor unions and community organizations.

Nissen was also the editor of Labor Studies Journalfor eight years, from 2000 through 2008.

Select published works

Solely authored books
Fighting for Jobs: Case Studies of Labor-Community Coalitions Confronting Plant Closings. Albany, N.Y.: State University of New York Press, 1995.

Co-authored books
Lieberman, Karen and Nissen, Bruce. Ethics in the Hospitality Industry, second edition.  Lansing, Mich.: Educational Institute, 2008.

Solely edited books
Unions in a Globalized Environment: Changing Borders, Organizational Boundaries, and Social Roles. Armonk, N.Y.: M.E. Sharpe, Inc., 2002. 
Which Direction for Organized Labor? Essays on Organizing, Outreach, and Internal Transformation. Detroit: Wayne State University Press, 1999. 
Unions and Workplace Reorganization. Detroit: Wayne State University Press, 1997. 
U.S. Labor Relations 1945-1989:  Accommodation and Conflict. New York: Garland Publishing, 1990.

Co-edited books
Craypo, Charles and Nissen, Bruce, eds. Grand Designs: The Impact of Corporate Strategies on Workers, Unions and Communities. Ithaca, N.Y.: ILR Press, 1993. 
Larson, Simeon and Nissen, Bruce, eds. Theories of the Labor Movement. Detroit: Wayne State University Press, 1987.

Solely authored book chapters
“A Different Kind of Union:  SEIU Healthcare Florida from the mid-1990s through 2008,” pp. 289–313 in Life and Labor in the New New South (Robert Zieger, ed.), University Press of Florida, 2012.  
“Using Sociological Skills for Movements to Confront Power: The Genesis of the Research Institute for Social and Economic Policy,” pp. 116–119 in Sociologists in Action (Kathleen Odell Korgen, Jonathan M. White, and Shelley K. White, eds.), Pine Forge/Sage Press, 2011. 
“Sindicatos de Trabajadores y Ciudadanos in Estados Unidos: Reflexiones Teóricas y un Estudio de Caso” (translated from English), pp. 251–272 in Trabajo and Ciudadania: Un Reflexion Necesaria Para la Sociedad del S XXI (Arnulfo Arteaga Garcia, ed.), Universidad Autónoma Metropolitana (Unidad Itzapalapa, Departmento de Sociología), 2010.  
“Labor from the 1980s through the New Millenium,” entry in Encyclopedia of U.S. Labor and Working Class History (edited by Eric Arnesen).  New York: Routledge, 2007.  
“The Impact of Globalization on Workforce Development and Composition in Florida: Debates, Impacts, and Potential Policy Responses,” pp. 42–61 in Globalization and Labour Laws (edited by Nandini C P).  Hyderabad, India: ICFAI University Press, 2007. 
“Labor since the 1960s,” entry in The American Midwest: an Interpretive Encyclopedia (edited by Richard Sisson, Christian Zacher, and Andrew Cayton).  Bloomington, IN: Indiana University Press, 2006.  
“The Impact of Globalization on Workforce Development and Composition in Florida: Debates, Impacts, and Potential Policy Responses,” pp. 70–90 in Florida’s Global Frontiers: Impacts of Trade Liberalization (edited by M. Mark Amen).  Tampa, FL: University of South Florida Globalization Research Center, 2005.
"Labor-Community Coalition Strengths and Weaknesses: Case Study Evidence." In Partnering for Change: Unions and Community Groups Build Coalitions for Economic Justice. David Reynolds, ed. Armonk, N.Y.: M.E. Sharpe, 2004. 
"The Miami Living Wage Ordinance: Primary and Secondary Effects." In Living Wage Movements: Global Perspectives. Deborah Figart, ed.  New York: Routledge, 2004. 
"Unions and Workplace Reorganization." In Unions and Workplace Reorganization. Bruce Nissen, ed. Detroit: Wayne State University Press, 1997. 
"Utilizing the Membership to Organize the Unorganized." In Organizing to Win: New Research on Union Strategies. Kate Bronfenbrenner, Sheldon Friedman, Richard W. Hurd, Rudolph A. Oswald, and Ronald L. Seeber, eds. Ithaca, N.Y.: ILR Press, 1998.

Co-authored book chapters
Bruce Nissen, Charles Whalen and Immanuel Ness.  “Let a Thousand Journals Bloom:  the Precarious Landscape of Labor and Employment Publishing,” pp. 142–160 in New Directions in the Study of Work and Employment: Revitalizing Industrial Relations as an Academic Enterprise (Charles Whalen, ed.).  Northampton, MA: Edward Elgar, 2008.  
Bruce Nissen and Monica Russo.  “Strategies for Labor Revitalization: The Case of Miami,” pp. 147–162 in Labor in the New Urban Battlegrounds: Local Solidarity in a Global Economy (edited by Lowell Turner and Daniel B. Cornfield.  Ithaca, NY: Cornell University Press, 2007.
Nissen, Bruce and Grenier, Guillermo. "Unions and Immigrants in South Florida: A Comparison." In Unions in a Globalized Environment: Changing Borders, Organizational Boundaries, and Social Roles. Bruce Nissen, ed. Armonk, N.Y.: M.E. Sharpe, Inc., 2002. 
Nissen, Bruce and Rosen, Seth. "Community Based Organizing: Transforming Union Organizing Programs from the Bottom Up." In Which Direction for Organized Labor? Essays on Organizing, Outreach, and Internal Transformation. Bruce Nissen, ed.  Detroit: Wayne State University Press, 1999.

Solely authored journal articles
“Serving the Faculty Union in Fighting Austerity Policies:  A Case Study of Labor Studies Research on One’s Own Campus.”  Labor Studies Journal, Volume 39, No. 1 (March 2014), pp. 46–59.  
“Political Activism as Part of a Broader Civic Engagement: The Case of SEIU Florida Healthcare Union.”  Labor Studies Journal, Volume 35, No. 1 (March 2010), pp. 51–72.
“Social Justice Infrastructure Organizations as New Actors from the Community: The Case of South Florida.”  Journal of Community Practice, Volume 17, No. 1-2 (January–June 2009), pp. 157–169. 
“Would the Employee Free Choice Act effectively protect the right to unionize?  Evidence from a south Florida nursing home case.”  Labor Studies Journal, Volume 34, No. 1 (March 2009), pp. 65–90.   
“Global Labor Solidarity Attempts and the Lessons Learned.”  Work and Occupations, Volume 35, No. 4 (November 2008), pp. 456–461. 
“State Minimum Wage Increases and Job Loss: The Florida Experience,” Perspectives on Work, Volume 11, No. 1 (Summer 2007), pp. 20–22.  
“Trouble in Paradise: Organizing Condominium Workers in the Sunshine State,” New Labor Forum, Vol.14, No. 3 (2005), pp. 34–43.
“Upsurge and Fusion?  Thoughts on Dan Clawson’s The Next Upsurge,” Critical Sociology, Vol. 31, No. 3 (2005), pp. 423–431.
"Trouble in Paradise: Organizing Condominium Workers in the Sunshine State." New Labor Forum. 14:3 (2005).
"The Effectiveness and Limits of Labor-Community Coalitions: Evidence from South Florida." Labor Studies Journal. 29:1 (Spring 2004).
"What Are Scholars Telling the U.S. Labor Movement to Do?" Labor History. 44:2 (May 2003).
"Alternative Strategic Directions for the U.S. Labor Movement: Recent Scholarship." Labor Studies Journal. 28:1 (Spring 2003).
"The Recent Past and Near Future of Private Sector Unionism in the U.S.: An Appraisal." Journal of Labor Research. 24:2 (Spring 2003).
"The Role of Labor Education in Transforming a Union Toward Organizing Immigrants: A Case Study." Labor Studies Journal. 27:1 (Spring 2002).
"Building a Minority Union: The CWA Experience at NCR." Labor Studies Journal. 25:4 (Winter 2001).
"Living Wage Campaigns from a 'Social Movement' Perspective: The Miami Experience." Labor Studies Journal. 25:3 (Fall 2000).
"The Remarkable Rehabilitation of Company Unionism in Recent Industrial Relations Literature." Critical Sociology. 25:1 (1999).
"Alliances Across the Border: U.S. Labor in the Era of Globalization." Working USA. 3:1 (May/June 1999).
"Fighting the Union in a 'Union Friendly' Company: The AT&T/NCR Case." Labor Studies Journal. 23:3 (Fall 1998).
"Union Struggles Against Plant Closings: Case Study Evidence and Policy Recommendations", Policy Studies Journal, Vol. 18, No. 2 (Winter, 1989–90), pp. 382–395. (Special issue on organized labor)
"Enterprise Zones as an Economic Development Tool: The Indiana Experience", Regional Science Perspectives, Vol. 19, No. 2 (Winter 1989), pp. 3–20.
"Labor's Stake in Urban Development Policy: The Case of Enterprise Zones", Labor Studies Journal, Vol. 8, No. 1 (Spring 1983), pp. 5–17.
"U.S. Workers and the U.S. Labor Movement." Monthly Review. May 1981.

Co-authored journal articles
Bruce Nissen and Rick Smith. “A Novel Way to Represent and Reframe the Interests of Workers: The People’s Budget Review in St. Petersburg, Florida.”  Labor Studies Journal", Volume 40, No. 1 (March 2015),l pp. 84-102.
"Bruce Nissen and Emily Eisenhauer, “University Based Research for Social Change: Lessons Learned.” Theory in Action, Volume 4, No. 2 (April 2011), pp. 21-30.
Bruce Nissen and Sherman Henry.  “The Legacy of Racism:  a Case Study of Continuing Racial Impediments to Union Effectiveness.”  Labor Studies Journal, Volume 33, No. 4 (December 2008), pp. 349-370.
Bruce Nissen, Alejandro Angee, and Marc Weinstein.  “Immigrant Construction Workers and Health and Safety: the South Florida Experience.”  Labor Studies Journal, Volume 33, No. 1 (March 2008), pp. 48-62. 
Bruce Nissen and Monica Russo.  “Building a Movement: Revitalizing Labor in Miami,” Working USA, Vol. 9, No. 1 (March 2006), pp. 123-139.
Bruce Nissen and Guillermo Grenier, “Union Responses to Mass Immigration: The Case of Miami, USA”, Antipode, Vol. 33, No. 3 (July 2001), pp. 567-592.
Bruce Nissen and Guillermo Grenier, “Local Union Relations with Immigrants: The Case of South Florida”, Labor Studies Journal, Vol. 26, No. 1 (Spring 2001), pp. 76-97.
Bruce Nissen and Guillermo Grenier, “Comparative Union Responses to Mass Immigration: Evidence from an Immigrant City”, Critical Sociology, Vol. 26, No. 1 / 2 (2000), pp. 82-105.
Bruce Nissen and Seth Rosen, “The CWA Model of Membership Based Organizing”, Labor Studies Journal, Vol. 24, No. 1 (Spring 1999) pp. 73-88. 
Bruce Nissen and Peter Seybold, "Labor and Monopoly Capital in the Labor Education Context", Monthly Review, Vol. 46, No. 6 (November 1994), pp. 36-44.
Bruce Nissen and Lynn Feekin, "Early Warning Against Plant Closings: Issues and Prospects", Labor Studies Journal, Vol. 16, No. 4 (Winter 1991), pp. 20-33.
Bruce Nissen and Thomas R. DuBois. "Changing Industrial Relations in Steel: Implications for Labor Education." Labor Studies Journal. 12:2 (Fall 1987), pp. 38-50.
Bruce Nissen and Charles Ellinger, "A Case Study of a Failed QWL Program: Implications for Labor Education", Labor Studies Journal, Vol. 11, No. 3 (Winter 1987), pp. 195-219.
Bruce Nissen and Charles Ellinger, "UCLEA Steward Training Programs: A Report and Evaluation", Labor Studies Journal, Vol. 9, No. 1 (Spring 1984), pp. 19-45.

Notes

References
 Bruce Nissen, Center for Labor Research and Studies, Florida International University
 Who's Who in America. 58th ed. New Providence, NJ: Marquis Who's Who, 2004. 
 Writers' Directory.'' 22nd ed. Farmington Hills, Mich.: Gale Group, 2007.

External links
  Center for Labor Research and Studies, Florida International University
  Research Institute on Social and Economic Policy, Florida International University

Labor historians
21st-century American historians
21st-century American male writers
Historians of the United States
1948 births
People from Ames, Iowa
People from Miami
Grinnell College alumni
Rutgers University alumni
Columbia University alumni
Florida International University faculty
Indiana University faculty
Living people
Historians from Iowa
Historians from Florida
American male non-fiction writers